Rachael Bade is an American journalist who is a co-author of the Politico Playbook newsletter and a former political analyst for CNN. She spent two years reporting on U.S. Congress for The Washington Post.

Early life and education 
Bade was raised in Ohio, and received a BA in political science and journalism from the University of Dayton in 2010. Before her journalism career, she was a classical ballet dancer, training during summers with Pacific Northwest Ballet, Ballet Austin and American Ballet Theatre.

Career 
Bade started her journalism career in 2010 as a reporter for Congressional Quarterly and Roll Call. She joined Politico in 2012 to cover taxes, a beat that launched her career when the IRS targeting controversy broke. Bade closely followed the House Republican investigation of the IRS's treatment of conservative tax-exempt groups and was the only reporter to interview Lois Lerner, the IRS leader at the heart of the scandal who asserted her Fifth Amendment right on Capitol Hill, refusing to answer investigators' questions.

Bade later covered the Republican Party's investigation of the 2012 Benghazi terrorist attack and the party's subsequent probe of Hillary Clinton's private email use. She was promoted to Politico's Congress team in early 2016, where she wrote about Speaker Paul Ryan's leadership, winning an award for a magazine profile that first reported on Ryan's decision to step down from Congress. She spent three years covering House Republicans and the party's transformation under Donald Trump, filing stories that illuminated Republican infighting over the future of the party and providing information about how policy decisions were made.

Bade joined The Washington Post as a congressional reporter in 2019 to write about House Democrats' oversight of the Trump administration. She helped lead the publication's coverage of the Trump impeachment inquiry and has since announced that she is writing a book about the process for William Marrow with colleague Karoun Demirjian. Bade left The Washington Post in December 2020 and rejoined Politico in early 2021.

Bade is a contributor for CNN and has appeared on CBS "Face the Nation" and ABC's "This Week". She has also appeared on Fox News, including "Fox News Sunday", as well as MSNBC and PBS.

Personal life
In February 2022, Bade announced that she was expecting a baby girl in the summer of 2022 after undergoing five rounds of in vitro fertilization.

References

External links

American political journalists
CNN people
The Washington Post journalists
Politico people
American women journalists
21st-century American journalists
21st-century American women writers
Journalists from Ohio
University of Dayton alumni
Living people
1989 births